Martin Bergen or Marty Bergen may refer to:
 Martin V. Bergen (c. 1872 – 1941), American football player, coach, lawyer
 Marty Bergen (bridge) (born 1948), American bridge champion
 Marty Bergen (baseball) (1871–1900), Major League Baseball player
 Marty Bergen (jockey) (1869–1906), American National Champion jockey